The Trans-Sahara Highway or TAH 2, also known as the African Unity Road, is a transnational highway project nearing completion to pave, improve and ease border formalities on an existing trade route running north–south across the Sahara Desert. It runs between North Africa bordered by the Mediterranean Sea in the north and West Africa bordered by the Atlantic Ocean in the south, from Algiers in Algeria to Lagos in Nigeria, giving it the alternative names of the Algiers–Lagos Highway or Lagos–Algiers Highway.

The Trans-Sahara Highway is one of the oldest transnational highways in Africa and one of the most complete, having been proposed in 1962, with construction of sections in the Sahara starting in the 1970s. Its central section is still little-used though, and still requires special vehicles and precautions to be taken to survive the harsh environment and climate of the center of the desert.

Route and status

Overall features, length and condition

The Trans-Sahara Highway has a length of about 4,500 km of which about 85% has been paved. It passes through only three countries, since Algeria and Nigeria are separated by Niger alone. However, an additional 3,600 km of linked highways to Tunisia, Mali, and Chad are considered by planners to be integral to the Trans-Sahara Highway.

All the 1,200 km of the highway lying in Nigeria is part of that country's national paved road network and includes nearly 500 km of four-lane divided sections, but highway maintenance is frequently deficient in Nigeria and at times parts of the road may be in poor condition, including having lost the pavement.

About half the highway, over 2,300 km, lies in Algeria and is mostly in good condition, but particularly south of Tamanrasset much of it is in poor condition, with the last section from In Guezzam to the Niger border due for being paved in 2022.

Niger has 985 km of the highway of which 785 km is paved but also in poor condition. Further details are given below.

Another crossing of the Sahara is proposed for the Tripoli–Cape Town Highway (Trans-African Highway 3) but this route requires a great deal more construction, faces problems of instability and lawlessness in northern Chad, and is not likely to stimulate trade to the same extent as TAH 2. Consequently, it may be decades away from completion.

Two other Trans-African Highways cross the Sahara, but at its edges. In 2005 the Cairo–Dakar Highway (TAH 1) in the west along the Atlantic coast became the first fully sealed highway crossing the Sahara from north to south (barring a few kilometres in No Man's Land between Morocco/Western Sahara and Mauritania). The Cairo–Cape Town Highway (TAH 4) follows the Nile in the east, the previous long unpaved sections in Sudan, Ethiopia and Kenya have since been significantly improved. The highway from Nanyuki in Kenya to Moyale at the Ethiopian border is an excellent tarmac road. The roads in Ethiopia and Sudan are all tarmac of largely decent quality as at October 2020.

Announced in 2018, by 2019 a third trade route opened up between Algeria and Mauritania, but has yet to be classified. Established during the French colonial era as a link between Algiers with Dakar to avoid the then Spanish Sahara on the Atlantic, it was closed in 1963. Currently tarmac ends on the Algerian border just south of Tindouf and resumes some 900-kilometres later at Zouerat, passing via Bir Moghrein.

Route

The cities and countries served, and status of the road are as follows.

In Algeria
Algiers to Ghardaia, 625 km, paved, in good condition
Ghardaia to Tamanrasset, 1,291 km, paved in good condition
Tamanrasset to In Guezzam at the Niger border, 400 km, paved.
In Guezzam to Assamaka, the Niger border post: 28 km of soft sand tracks and can be done in conventional 2WD vehicles though not recommended.

see also: Algeria–Niger border

In Niger
Assamaka to Arlit, 200 km, marked track over sand sheet but can be done in conventional 2WD vehicles.
Arlit to Agadez, 243 km, paved in 1980, with sections in poor condition.
Agadez to Zinder, 431 km, paved.
Zinder-Magaria at the Nigerian border, 111 km, paved but in poor condition.

see also: Niger-Nigeria border

In Nigeria
 Niger border to Lagos via Kano, Kaduna, Oyo, Ibadan: 1,193 km of which 127 km is in good condition and 1,066 km 'fair'.

In summary, although a few paved sections may be in poor condition, only 200 km of the route remains as an unimproved desert track, and only 130 km remains unpaved but 'improved'.

Links to other transnational highways
The Trans-Sahara Highway intersects with:
 Cairo–Dakar Trans-African Highway in Algiers
 Trans-Sahelian Highway in Kano, Nigeria
 Trans–West African Coastal Highway in Lagos
 Lagos–Mombasa Highway in Lagos

See also

 Missions Berliet-Ténéré
 Trans–West African Coastal Highway
 Trans-Sahelian Highway
 Trans-African Highway network
 Transport in Niger

 History of Algeria (1962–1999)
 Civil War and Bouteflika

 History of Niger#Independence
 History of Niger: 
 Nigerian First Republic (1963–1966)
 Nigerian Second Republic (1979–1983)
 Nigerian Third Republic (1993)
 Nigerian Fourth Republic (1999–present)

References

Sources
 African Development Bank/United Nations Economic Commission For Africa: "Review of the Implementation Status of the Trans African Highways and the Missing Links: Volume 2: Description of Corridors". August 14, 2003. Retrieved 14 July 2007. 
 Sahara Overland; A Route and Planning Guide edition 2.

2
Roads in Niger